Leucadendron dregei, the summit conebush, is a flower-bearing shrub belonging to the genus Leucadendron and forms part of the fynbos. The plant is native to the Western Cape, South Africa.

Description

Fire destroys the plant but the seeds survive. The seeds are stored in a toll on the female plant and are released in hot weather and are dispersed by the wind. The plant is unisexual and there are male and female plants. Small towers do the pollination. The species is rare, grows slowly and experiences too many fires for good reproduction.

Distribution and habitat
The plant occurs in the Swartberg from Touwsberg to Meiringspoort.

References

Threatened Species Programme | SANBI Red List of South African Plants
Leucadendron dregei (Summit conebush)
Summit Conebush

dregei